This article displays the rosters for the teams competing at the EuroBasket Women 1966.

Group A













Group B













References

External links
 FIBA Archive

EuroBasket Women squads